Baldev is a given name. Notable persons with that name include:

 Baldev Singh Aulakh (born 1964), Indian politician from Uttar Pradesh
 Baldev Raj Chawla, Indian politician from Punjab
 Baldev Raj Chopra (1914–2008), Indian Hindi director
 Baldev Singh Dhillon (born 1947), Indian agricultural scientist
 Baldev Dua (1936–2002), Indian cricketer
 Baldev Raj Gupta (born 1942), Indian linguistic scientist, and a Punjabi and Hindi writer
 Baldev Khosa, India actor and politician from Maharashtra
 Baldev Mishra (1890–1975), Indian Maithili writer
 Baldev Olakh, Indian politician from Uttar Pradesh
 Baldev Raj Nayar (born 1931), Indian political scientist
 Baldev Raj (born 1947), Indian nuclear scientist
 Baldev Singh (disambiguation), several persons
 Baldev Singh Mann (1952–1990), Indian politician from Punjab
 Baldev Singh Tomar (born 1970), Indian politician from  Himachal Pradesh
 Baldev Upadhyaya (1899–1999), Indian Hindi Sanskrit literary scholar

See also
 Baladeva (disambiguation)